Kovačić is a village near Knin, Šibenik-Knin County, Croatia, population 900 (census 2011).

References

Populated places in Šibenik-Knin County
Knin